Todd Interdonato is an American college baseball coach and former first baseman, outfielder and pitcher. Interdonato is the head baseball coach at Wofford College. He played college baseball at South Mountain Community College from 1997 to 1998 before transferring to University of North Carolina at Asheville from 1999 to 2000 for coach Mike Roberts before playing professionally in 2001.

Playing career
Interdonato first enrolled at South Mountain Community College. In 1998, he accepted a scholarship to play for the UNC Asheville Bulldogs baseball team.

Coaching career

On June 27, 2007, Intderdonato was promoted to head coach of the Wofford program.

Head coaching record

See also
 List of current NCAA Division I baseball coaches

References

External links
Wofford Terriers bio

Living people
Baseball first basemen
Baseball outfielders
Baseball pitchers
South Mountain Cougars baseball players
UNC Asheville Bulldogs baseball players
Evansville Otters players
UNC Asheville Bulldogs baseball coaches
Gardner–Webb Runnin' Bulldogs baseball coaches
Fort Scott Greyhounds baseball coaches
Wofford Terriers baseball coaches
Year of birth missing (living people)